Mauricio Henao Serbia (born on 16 February 1987 in Armenia, Quindío, Colombia) is a Colombian actor best known for his roles in telenovelas for Telemundo.

Career
Henao grew up in Colombia until he turned 12 years, then moved to the United States where he studied at Cypress Creek High School. Subsequently he dedicated himself to modeling for different local cities in both Europe and the United States, arriving to work with Nicolas Felizola, Tommy Hilfiger, Calvin Klein, Paul Joe Paris, among others. Henao has repeatedly been compared to actors like James Dean, and Ryan Gosling. After appearing in several magazines as a model. In 2009 he decided to move to Miami, United States, where he began taking acting classes and learned to modify his Colombian accent. Subsequently, in 2010 he decides to perform the casting for Telemundo' telenovela ¿Dónde está Elisa?, where he played Eduardo Cáceres. Later that in the same year, he returns to work for Telemundo in the telenovela El fantasma de Elena, where he plays Michell. Although he had already excelled in two television projects, the role that made him be recognized nationally and internationally was Tony, main character of the first season of the Nickelodeon teen drama series Grachi. While filming Grachi, he came up with the opportunity to work for another Telemundo telenovela entitled Mi corazón insiste en Lola Volcán, where he played Daniel Santacruz, the younger brother of Jencarlos Canela in the telenovela.

In 2012 he won his first major role in the MTV teen drama series Último año, where he shared credits with Dulce María. In 2013, he obtained a special participation in the last chapters of the Televisa telenovela La Tempestad. In 2014 he was part of the main cast in the Telemundo telenovela La impostora. The following year he joined the cast of the series Señora Acero, where he played José Ángel Godoy, Michel Duval's best friend in the series. This project unlike Grachi gave him more acting recognition, and lasted three seasons as part of the regular cast.

Filmography

Awards and nominations

References

External links

Living people
Colombian emigrants to the United States
American male television actors
American male telenovela actors
1987 births
People from Armenia, Colombia
Cypress Creek High School (Florida) alumni